Objective: Kursk is a 1984 computer wargame designed by Gary Grigsby and released by Strategic Simulations, Inc.

Gameplay
Objective: Kursk is a computer wargame that simulates the Battle of Kursk between German and Soviet forces during World War II. It supports both single-player and two-player modes. The player controls the German side against the Soviets in the single-player mode.

Publication history
Objective: Kursk was published by Strategic Simulations, Inc. alongside its title 50 Mission Crush, which also covers World War II. It was designed by Gary Grigsby, and was among the three computer wargames he released in 1984, alongside War in Russia and Reforger '88. It was made with the same game engine and mechanics that Grigsby employed in Reforger. Objective: Kursk was released for the Apple II and Atari 800 lines of personal computers.

Reception

Reviewing Objective: Kursk for Electronic Games, Neil Shapiro called it "a fine historical simulation". However, he considered it particularly dry, and "lack[ing] in a subjective 'feel' of fluidity, control and understandable challenge that I personally look for when I feel like gaming". In Antic, Dr. John F. Stanoch praised the recreation of the Battle of Kursk, but noted that "the game is long and might become tedious for some players."

In a Page 6 survey of wargames for Atari computers, writer M. Evan Brooks placed Objective: Kursk in the "moribund" category. While he found it "extremely detailed", he argued that the end result was "bland" and hampered by a cumbersome interface. A wargame survey from the French magazine Jeux et Stratégie declared, "More accessible than Reforger '88 or War in Russia, Objective: Kursk is still for real wargamers." Tilts 1986 wargame survey was also positive toward the game.

Reviews
 Casus Belli #22 (Oct 1984)

References

External links

1984 video games
Apple II games
Atari 8-bit family games
Computer wargames
Strategic Simulations games
Turn-based strategy video games
Video games about Nazi Germany
Video games developed in the United States
Video games set in the Soviet Union
World War II video games